Donboli is a Turkic-speaking Kurdish tribe living around Khoy and Salmas in West Azerbaijan Province in Iran.

History

The Donboli came from Bokhtan, a Kurdish region between Siirt and Cizre in what is now southeastern Turkey. The first ancestor was a certain Isa Beg, who became in 1378 the ruler of Sokmanabad. His descendant, Sheikh Ahmad Beg, entered service of the Turkmen Aq Quyunlu, and then the family held several posts in Persian administration. According to Sharafkhan Bidlisi, the members of Donboli tribes were Yezidi, but one of their leaders by the name of Isa Beg, together with other families, converted to Islam. Ahmad Beg's son, Hajji Beg (Hajji Soltan), was the governor of Sokmanabad and Khoy under Tahmasp I of the Safavid dynasty who ruled as Shah of Persia 1501-1722. In 1530, the Donboli family could establish a semi-autonomous emirate in that area, including the regions of Churs and Salmas. In the time of Shah Abbas I the family spread into a line in Churs and in Khoy, sometimes fighting for superpower over the other. After the fall of the Safavid dynasty in 1736, the Donboli governors became the hereditary Khans of Khoy and Tabriz.
The Donboli clan reigned the Khoy Khanate as well as the Tabriz Khanate as semi-independent rulers for nearly fifty years between the death of Nader Shah Afshar in 1747 and the coronation of Agha Mohammad Khan Qajar in 1796. They allied as well with three succeeding ruling houses, the Afshar dynasty, Zand dynasty and Qajar dynasty of Persia.

The first outstanding emir of this time was Najaf Qoli Khan. After Najaf Qoli Khan's father Shahbaz Khan I was killed in 1731 by his cousin Ayub Khan of Churs, he succeeded him as the governor of Churs and Salmas. In 1734, he entered the service of the later Nader Shah Afshar as chief musketeer. He followed the shah on his conquests to India and was made amir ol-'omara (lit. "commander of commanders) and later the governor of Khoy. In 1742, he became beglerbegi (lit. "governor of governors", i.e. governor-general) of Tabriz. In 1747, he became the ruling Khan of Tabriz and remained in this post also under Nader Shah's successor. In the war of succession between several pretenders to the Persian throne, Najaf Qoli Khan and his nephew Shahbaz Khan II joined in 1750 Fath Ali Khan Afshar-Arashlu of Urmia. The acting rule of Khoy and Salmas was commissioned to Shahbaz Khan II, Najaf Qoli Khan held Tabriz and Churs. After the death of Fath Ali Khan, the Donboli khans pledged their allegiances in 1757 to Mohammad Hassan Khan Qajar, who made his minor son Agha Mohammad Khan the ruler of Tabriz and Najaf Qoli Khan the young prince's guardian. In 1762, they allied with Karim Khan Zand, who sent Shahbaz Khan and Najaf Qoli Khan's son Abdol-Razzaq Beg as hostages to Shiraz in 1763. While Najaf Qoli Khan stayed as the pacified ruler in his khanate and Shahbaz Khan remained de facto governor of Khoy in Shiraz, the real power in the Donboli domains was Shahbaz' brother Amir Ahmad Khan, who reigned from 1763 until his death in 1786 as the strongest Donboli ruler and an opponent to Agha Mohammad Khan's claims as the overlord of all Persia. Finally, in 1786, Ahmad Khan and his eldest son were killed by Shahbaz' sons, maybe on behalf of the Qajar shah. 
Ahmad Khan's second son Hossein Qoli Khan succeeded his father in 1786. In 1791, he arranged with Agha Mohammad Khan and his Qajar dynasty, and became the governor of Tabriz, Khoy and Ardabil. In 1792, Hossein Qoli Khan was entitled amir ol-'omara and beglerbegi of Azerbaijan. He also attended the shah's coronation on the Mughan steppe in 1792, where Agha Mohammad was proclaimed shahanshah and emperor of all of Iran. In 1793, he fell out of favor when he allied with Ibrahim Khali Khan Javanshir, the ruling khan of Karabakh, and married his daughter. But in 1797, he was reinstated in all posts by Fath Ali Shah Qajar, who married his son Mohammad Taqi Mirza to Hossein Qoli Khan's daughter. After Hossein Qoli Khan's death in 1798, he was succeeded by his younger brother, Jafar Qoli Khan, who rebelled against the central government with his 15.000 men, being defeated by the crown prince Abbas Mirza, and finally migrated to Russia in 1800. In addition with the two Russo-Persian wars this terminated the Donboli rule in 1809 and ended their regional dominance in 1827. But members of the family held several government posts in Azerbaijan and other provinces of Iran.

Genealogy

First Line
Amir Isa Beg, 1378 ruler of Sokmanabad
Amir Nazer Ali Khan (his son)
Amir Sheikh Ahmad Beg (his son), 1467 entered Aq Quyunlu administration 
Amir Bahlol called "Haji Beg" (his son), 1526 governor of Sokmanabad and Khoy, died 1548
Soltan Ali Beg (his son)
Soltan Nazer Beg (his son)
Soltan Qobeh Beg (his brother)
Amir Rostam called "Shahverdi Khan" (son of Hajji Beg)
Amir Behruz Khan I called "Salman Khalifa" (his son)
Amir Ayub Khan I (his son)
Amir Behruz Khan II called "Salman Khan" (his brother), 1616-1636 governor of Churs and Salmas, founded the Churs line:
Amir Ayub Khan II called "Subashi Khan" (his son), 1630-1659, governor of Churs, Salmas and Khoy
Amir Morteza Qoli Khan the Great (his son), governor of Churs.
Amir Shahbandeh Khan (son of Ayub Khan I)
Amir Ali Khan called "Safi Qoli Khan", 1630-1674 (his son)
Amir Morteza Qoli Khan I (his son), founded the Kashan line:
Ghias od-Din Beg (his son)
Sharif Beg, called "Abbas Manzur Khan" (his son)
Fazel Beg (his son)
Agha Mohammad Khan "Zarrabi" (his son)
Fath Ali Khan "Saba", called "Malek ol-Sho'ara", lit. "King of the Poets" (his son).
Mohammad Hossein Khan "Andalib", called "Malek ol-Sho'ara Thani" (his son)
Mahmoud Khan "Sharif", called "Malek ol-Sho'ara" , † 1893 (his son)
Mirza Jafar Khan "Sadr ol-Hokama", married Princess Beigom Rokni. (his son)
Hessamoddin Kamyar (his son)
Abolghasem Saba Kamal os-Saltaneh (his son)
Abolhasan Saba (his son)
Mirza Ali Khan (his son)
Mirza Mahdi Khan (his son)
Mirza Ahmad Khan (his son)
Mirza Mohammad Khan Nadimbashi "Khojasteh" (his son)
Gholamreza Khan "Saba" (his son)
Mohammad Hossein Khan "Bisharat od-Dowleh", Sartip of Mashhad Telegraph Office (his son)
Mohammad Hassan Khan "Malek ol-Hokama", lit. "King of the Doctors", Doctor in Mashhad and in 1906 he went to Sistan during the plague pandemic (his son)
Fathali Khan Saba "Masih os-Saltaneh", Doctor in Mashhad and later Tehran
Baba Khan (his son)
Abolghasem Khan "Forough" (his son)
Mirza Aboutaleb (his son)
Mirza Abolghasem (his son)
Mohammad Ali Khan Kashi (his son)
Mohammad Khan (his son)
Mirza Ahmad "Sabour", † 1814 (his son)
Mirza Mohammad Bagher (his son)
Mirza Mohammad Kazem "Sabouri", called "Malek ol-Sho'ara", † 1904 (his son)
Mohammad Taghi Bahar, † 1951 (his son) 
Mirza Hassan Khan (his son)
Zeynolabedin Khan "Hafez ol-Safheh", † 1908, Doctor in Mashhad (his son)
Hossein Gholi Khan (his son)
Amir Shahbaz Khan I (son of Morteza Qoli Khan I), † 1731, killed by Ayub Khan, governor of Churs and Salmas.

Line of Khans of Khoy
Morteza Qoli Khan II (son of Shahbaz Khan I), r. 1731-1746, 1st Khan of Khoy, succeeded his father 1731 in Khoy, † 1746, killed at Erivan in the tent of Nader Shah
Shahbaz Khan II (his son), r. 1746-1763, 2nd Khan of Khoy, succeeded his father 1746 in Khoy, † 1773 at Shiraz, 1747-1763 governor of Khoy and Salmas, kept as hostage at Shiraz 1763-1773
Saheb Soltan Khanom (daughter of Shahbaz Khan II), married Abul Fath Khan Zand, son of Karim Khan Zand
Mohammad Beg (son of Shahbaz Khan II)
Mahmud Khan (his son), †1844, governor of Khoy 1799-1800, succeeded his cousin Mohammad Sadegh as 8th Khan of Khoy
Mehr Nessa Khanom (his sister), married Fath Ali Shah Qajar
Ahmad Khan (son of Morteza Qoli Khan II), *1735, †1786 (killed by his nephews), succeeded his brother Shahbaz Khan 1763 in Khoy, 1763-1786 as governor of Khoy, 3rd Khan of Khoy
Kalb Ali Khan (his son), †1786 (killed with his father) 
Hossein Qoli Khan (his brother), *1756, †1798, succeeded his father 1786 in Khoy, 1786-1793 and 1797-1798 governor of Khoy, 4th Khan of Khoy, 1787 incorporated Tabriz in his domains
Mohammad Sadegh Khan (his son), amir ol-'omara and governor of Azerbaijan 1798-1813, succeeded his father in Khoy and 1798-1809 in Tabriz, 7th Khan of Khoy
Hossein Khan (his son)
Agha Mirza Ebrahim (his son)
Jafar Qoli Khan (brother of Hossein Qoli Khan), †1814, succeeded his brother 1793 and 1798 in Khoy, 1793-1797 and 1798-1799 governor of Khoy, 5th Khan of Khoy, migrated 1800 to Russia and became 1806-1814 governor of Shekki
Ismail Khan (his son), 1814-1819 Governor of Shekki,  Major-General in the Russian Army, †1819
Ahmed Khan (his son)
Kalb Ali Khan Khoyski (his son), Major-General in the Russian Army, †1834
Iskandar Khan Khoyski (his son)
Fatali Khan Khoyski (his son)
Husayn Khan Khoyski (his son), Deputy Governor-General of Democratic Rep. of Azerbaijan, Major-General in the Russian Army, †1955
Jahangir Khan Khoyski (his son)
Rustam Khan Khoyski (his son)
Abu Turab Khan (his son)

Amir Aslan Khan (youngest son of Ahmad Khan), †1838, involved in the war of succession between his elder brothers, entered service of Abbas Mirza, and became commander (sardar) in his army, fought in the Russo-Persian War (1826-28) for Iran between Tabriz and Iravan, and 1824-1827 was made vicegerent (vali) of Fort Aq Saray, governor of Tabriz and governor of Khoy, later governor of Khamseh and Zanjan.

Line of Khans of Tabriz
Najaf Qoli Khan I (son of Shahbaz Khan I), *1713, †1785, succeeded his father 1731 in Churs, 1731-1785 ruler of Churs and Salmas, succeeded his brother 1747 as head of the Donboli tribe, 1747-1785 ruler in Azerbaijan, 1769-1785 governor of Tabriz, 1st Khan of Tabriz
Khodadad Khan (his son), †1787 (killed by Sadegh Khan Shaqqaqi), succeeded his father 1785 in Tabriz, 1785-1787 governor of Tabriz, 2nd Khan of Tabriz
Hajji Fath Ali Beg (his son)
Najaf Qoli Khan II (his son), 1809 governor and ruling Khan of Tabriz. - After him Tabriz became the seat of the Persian crown prince of the Qajar dynasty who also was acting governor of Azerbaijan.

Line of Amir Aslan Khan Donboli
Amir Aslan Khan (youngest son of Ahmad Khan), †1838, involved in the war of succession between his elder brothers, entered service of Abbas Mirza, and became commander (sardar) in his army, fought in the Russo-Persian War (1826-28) for Iran between Tabriz and Iravan, and 1824-1827 was made vicegerent (vali) of Fort Aq Saray, governor of Tabriz and governor of Khoy, later governor of Khamseh and Zanjan. He had issued:
Salman Khan (his son). He had issued:
Hajji Qolam Ali Khan entitled Amin-e Divan (lit. "Trustworthy of the Government", i.e. "supreme judge") by Naser al-Din Shah, 1882 governor of Khoy
Mohammad Esmail Khan
Mohammad Zaman Khan called "Safar Khan"
Amanollah Khan Zia' os-Soltan, he married Princess Malekeh Afagh Khanom Qajar, daughter of Bahman Mirza
Abbas Ali Khan
Kalb Ali Khan
Asgar Khan.

References

Sources
 M.-J. Rǖbayānī, “Emārat wa farmān-ravaʾī-e Donbolīān dar Tabrīz wa manāṭeq-e arbaʿa,” in Majmūʿa-ye soḵan-rānīhā-ye šešomīn kongera-ye taḥqīqāt-e īrānī II, Tabrīz, 1357 Š./1978, pp. 352–77.
 ʿAbd-al-ʿAzīz Jawāher-al-Kalām “Omarā-ye Danābela dar Ḵoy wa Āḏarbāyjān,” in Āṯār al-Šīʿa al-emāmīya, Tehrān, 1307 Š./1928, pp. 205–17.
 ʿAbd-al-Razzāq Beg Donbolī, Tajrebat al-aḥrār wa taslīat al-abrār, 2 vols., Tabrīz,ed. Ḥ. Qāżī Ṭabāṭabāʾī, 1349-50 Š./1970-71.
 J. R. Perry, Karim Khan Zand, Chicago, 1979.
 E. Pakravan, Abbas Mirza. Un prince réformateur, Tehran, 1337 Š./1958.
 https://web.archive.org/web/20130619134312/http://donboli.com/

Kurdish tribes
History of Tabriz